Flashback is the fourth studio album by Swedish singer Darin. It was released on 3 December 2008 in Sweden and became Darin's fourth top 10 album.

Background
In mid-2007, Darin went into the studio to start work on his 4th studio album with producers such as Johan Bobäck and RedOne. Darin enlisted the help of American singer Kat DeLuna for the lead single "Breathing Your Love" which was produced by RedOne. The single was released in October 2008 and charted at number 2 on the Swedish singles chart.

Track listing

Notes
 signifies co-producer(s)
 signifies additional producer(s)
 signifies remix producer(s)

Charts

Release history

References

2008 albums
Albums produced by Ilya Salmanzadeh
Albums produced by Twin
Darin (singer) albums